The Large Black pig is a British breed of domestic pig. It is the only British pig that is entirely black. It was created in the last years of the nineteenth century by merging the black pig populations of Devon and Cornwall in the south-west with those of Essex, Suffolk and Kent in the south-east.  It is hardy, docile and prolific; it forages well and is suitable for extensive farming, but not well suited to intensive management.

It was a successful breed in the early twentieth century and was exported to many areas of the world. Population numbers declined after the Second World War, when the Howitt Report discouraged rearing of all but three pig breeds suitable for intensive pig farming. By the 1960s the breed was almost extinct. Although numbers have since risen, it is still an endangered breed.

History 

The Large Black resulted from the amalgamation of black pigs from two geographically separate areas, Devon and Cornwall in the south-west of England, and Essex, Suffolk and Kent in the east. The pigs from eastern England, mainly Essex, were influenced by importations from China in the late 18th century, while those from Devon and Cornwall were probably more closely related to the pigs in mainland Europe, particularly France. The Devon pigs were originally selected for "the length of their bodies, ears, noses, tail and hair, the longer the better, without reference to quality or substance", but selective breeding brought improvements to the breed, and by 1850 the type was small-boned and thick-bodied, with good conformation and constitution. Alternative origins proposed for the black colour of the breed are black Guinea hogs imported from Africa (similar to the Guinea Hog of the US) or from Neapolitan pigs.

During the late nineteenth century, the Large Black grew in popularity. A breed association, the Large Black Pig Society, was formed in 1898 or 1899, in Ipswich, Suffolk. A trademark, consisting of the letters LBP within a shield, was registered in 1902.

The Herd Book of Large Black Pigs was first published in 1899. In it the black pigs of Devon and Cornwall were combined under one name with the remnants of the smaller Black Essex, Black Suffolk or Small Black, and other black East Anglian breeds whose numbers had fallen below sustainable levels. There were considerable variations between the types in the two areas, but breeding stock was exchanged between them and by 1913 "general uniformity" had been achieved.

1920s to modern times 

In 1919 a Large Black sow was Supreme Champion at Smithfield (UK), and at the Royal Show that year 121 Large Blacks were entered, more than any other breed. Popularity of the breed peaked in the 1920s, however, and after World War II, population numbers declined as farmers began to favour pig breeds that would do well in intensive indoor farming. The breed association was merged with the National Pig Breeders Association (later the British Pig Association) in 1949.

In 1955 the Howitt report on the development of pig production in the United Kingdom was published. Its main conclusions were that UK pig farms were poorly placed to compete with European producers, that the diversity of local breeds in the UK was an obstacle to progress, and that British pig farmers should focus on three breeds only: the Welsh, the British Landrace, and the Large White. The report initiated a period of decline in all other British pig breeds, including the Large Black. By the time the Rare Breeds Survival Trust was founded 1973, numbers of all traditional pig breeds were dangerously low, and many of them were extinct. The Large Black was placed on the Trust's endangered list.

In other countries 
By 1913, Large Black had by then spread throughout most of Britain, and had been exported to most of mainland Europe and to North and South America, Africa and Oceania. The first exports to Australia were in 1902 or 1903, with the Large Black being chosen over the Berkshire pig because of their ability to thrive in hot weather, their foraging abilities and their fecundity. By 1930, Large Blacks represented only 1 percent of Australia pig population, and were raised mainly by breeders in Victoria, South Australia and Tasmania. The breed population continued to hover around 1 percent of the total population, with a slight increase after World War II and a decrease to almost zero new registrations in the 1980s. The first exports to the US were in the 1920s, but the population in that country dwindled to the point where imports were again necessary in 1985. Today, small herds can be found in the US that descend from the pigs imported in 1985 and 1990, and there are also herds in Canada, Australia, and South Africa.

Characteristics 

The Large Black is a long, deep-bodied pig, well known for its hardiness and suitability for extensive farming. Large Blacks are best suited for pasture-based farming due to their strong foraging and grazing ability, which efficiently converts poor quality feed into meat. It is the only pig breed in Britain to be all black, and this helps protect the pig from sunburn in sunny climates. Temperamentally, the Large Black is a very docile breed which is easily contained by fencing. This is partly because its large, drooping ears obscure its vision, although they also help to protect the face and eyes while the animal is foraging, especially when rooting in dirt.

The breed is also known for its long periods of fertility and strong maternal instincts. Sows give birth to a large litter of 8–10 piglets, but some sows have been known to have litters of up to 13 piglets. Also of note is the Large Black sow listed in the Guinness Book of Records for having produced 26 litters between 1940 and 1952 – the largest number of litters ever recorded for a pig. The breed has become larger over the years; in the early 1900s, weights averaged  for sows and larger for boars.

At its peak of popularity, the Large Black was used mainly for meat production, especially bacon. The meat from the Large Black is known for its lean quality and flavour without an excess of back fat, but for commercial production it was often crossed with the Yorkshire and Middle White pigs, producing a vigorous hybrid that was well regarded by farmers. However, today commercial processors do not favour the black skin of the purebred Large Black.

Conservation status 

In 1954 there were 2195 Large Blacks recorded, 269 licensed boars and 1926 registered sows, representing approximately 3.4% of the UK pig population of about 65,000; at the end of 2011 there were 421 registered (86 boars and 335 sows), a small increase over the 2010 figure of 405 (65 boars, 340 sows). The Large Black is the rarest historic pig breed in Britain, although numbers are slowly on the rise due to an increase in demand for meat from traditional pig breeds. In 2011 it was classified as "vulnerable" on the watchlist of the Rare Breeds Survival Trust, meaning that there are believed to be between 200 and 300 breeding females. The British Pig Association currently recognizes 6 boar lines and 24 sow lines within the breed.

In 2004 the Rare Breeds Trust of Australia listed the status of the Large Black as "critical", meaning that sow registrations in the Australian Pure Bred Pig Herd Book of the Australian Pig Breeders Association were fewer than 30 per year.

The American Livestock Breeds Conservancy estimated the Large Black population of the United States at 300 breeding hogs in 2008, and lists its status as "critical", which means that fewer than 200 animals are registered each year in the United States, and there are estimated to be fewer than 2,000 worldwide. The US Large Black population was around 300 in 2008. Besides conservation for the sake of genetic diversity in livestock, the breed is also coming to be seen as a good option for fulfilling the needs of an increasing number of consumers interested in pasture-raised pork. Rare Breeds Canada identified the single remaining Canadian herd in 1997, and has since included the breed on its conservation watchlist as "endangered", with fewer than 500 of the animals in that country.

References 

Pig breeds originating in England
Conservation Priority Breeds of the Livestock Conservancy
Animal breeds on the RBST Watchlist